The Hero of Labor (or Labor Hero) is the highest title of honor in the Socialist Republic of Vietnam. It is awarded (possibly posthumously) to individuals or collectives with outstanding achievements in labor. This includes supporting the objective of a strong country and an equitable, democratic, prosperous, and civilized society. Awardees are loyal to the Socialist Republic of Vietnam, and possess revolutionary virtues and qualities. It can be awarded to collectives for the same reasons that have maintained good internal unity, strong Party affiliations and mass organizations.

History 
This prize was officially created in 1970 by the National Assembly of Vietnam of the Democratic Republic of Vietnam. The National Assembly Standing Committee reviewed the proposal of the Government Council. However, the Congress of emulation fighters began awarding it in 1952.

In 1999, the Socialist Republic of Vietnam reestablished the prize. The 2003 Law of Emulation again renewed it.

Recipients

Individuals 

 Konstantin Feoktistov
 Mai Kieu Lien
 Andriyan Nikolayev
 Leonid Popov
 Valery Ryumin
 Valentina Tereshkova
 Trần Đại Nghĩa (1954)
 Boris Yegorov
 Phạm Tuân (1980)
 Mai Kieu Lien (2005)
 Trương Thái Sơn (2020), a worker of the Ho Chi Minh City Electricity Corporation
 Dr. Huỳnh Thị Phương Liên (2021), vaccine developer
 Dr. Trần Bình Giang (2020), director of Viet Duc Hospital
 Phạm Thị Huân (2020), chairwoman of Ba Huân JSC
 Thái Hương (2020), chairwoman of TH Group
 Trần Cẩm Nhung (2020), member of the Council of Vietnam Children's Fund
 Đặng Ái Việt (2020), painter

Collectives 

 National Hospital of Tropical Diseases (2004)
Vinatex (2016)
PV Gas (2016)
University of Medicine and Pharmacy of Ho Chi Minh City (2021)
SSI Securities JSC (2020)
Cao Lãnh District (2021)
Thanh Hoa Provincial General Hospital (2021)
Da Nang University of Science and Technology
Vissan company
Thai Nguyen Central Hospital (2021)
Vietnam Bank for Social Policies (VBSP)
Cholimex Food JSC
Vietnam National University, Ho Chi Minh City (2020)
Vietnam Electricity (2020)
Nhơn Trạch District (2021)
People's Procuracy of An Giang province (2021)

See also
 Vietnam awards and decorations
 Hero of Socialist Labour
 Hero of Labor (North Korea)
 Hero of Labour (GDR)

References

Awards established in 1970
Orders, decorations, and medals of Vietnam
Business and industry awards
Hero (title)